Austin Leander Staley (December 30, 1902 – August 3, 1978) was a United States circuit judge of the United States Court of Appeals for the Third Circuit.

Education and career

Born in Pittsburgh, Pennsylvania, Staley received a Bachelor of Laws from Duquesne University School of Law in 1928. He was in private practice in Pittsburgh from 1928 to 1950. He was an assistant city solicitor in Pittsburgh in 1934. He was a deputy attorney general of Commonwealth of Pennsylvania from 1934 to 1935. He was Director of the State Workmen's Compensation Bureau from 1935 to 1936. He was a deputy secretary of the Pennsylvania Department of Labor and Industry from 1936 to 1939.

Federal judicial service

Staley was nominated by President Harry S. Truman on April 27, 1950, to a seat on the United States Court of Appeals for the Third Circuit vacated by Judge John Joseph O`Connell. He was confirmed by the United States Senate on June 27, 1950, and received his commission on July 5, 1950. He served as Chief Judge and as a member of the Judicial Conference of the United States from 1966 to 1967. He assumed senior status on December 31, 1967. His service terminated on August 3, 1978, due to his death.

References

Sources
 

1902 births
1978 deaths
Judges of the United States Court of Appeals for the Third Circuit
United States court of appeals judges appointed by Harry S. Truman
20th-century American judges